Electronics 7 is a Soviet Russian brand of seven-segment industrial digital clocks with four or eleven seven-segment luminescent digits.  It had a separate binary-to-seven-segment decoder board for each digit, while the actual timekeeping was done by a main board which emitted the digits of the time as binary code.  Most models used Russian-made vacuum-fluorescent indicators, but there were also models based on light-emitting diodes. All the street and wall clocks were based on a kit produced by the "Reflector" factory in Saratov, and many remain in use at administrative and industrial premises in Russia.

Clock brands
Soviet brands
Ministry of the Electronics Industry (Soviet Union) products